Harvey Louis Dunn (6 August 1899 – 12 September 1961) was an Australian rules footballer who played with Carlton in the Victorian Football League (VFL). His son, Harvey Dunn Jr., also played for Carlton and was recruited under the father–son rule.

Notes

External links 

Harvey Dunn's profile at Blueseum

1899 births
1961 deaths
Australian rules footballers from Melbourne
Australian Rules footballers: place kick exponents
Carlton Football Club players
Box Hill Football Club coaches
People from Carlton North, Victoria